Sarai Gascón Moreno (born 16 November 1992 in Terrassa, Province of Barcelona) is a swimmer from Catalonia, Spain.

Personal life 
Gascón was born 16 November 1992 in Terrassa, Province of Barcelona. She has a disability in that she was born without part of her left forearm. In 2013, she was awarded the silver Royal Award for Merit in Sports (Real Orden al Mérito Deportivo).

Career 
Gascón is an S9 type swimmer. She is affiliated with the Spanish Federation of Sports for the Physically Disabled (FEDDF).

In 2007, Gascón competed at the IDM German Open. She raced at the 2008 Summer Paralympics, where she earned a silver in the 100 meter breaststroke race.
At the 2009 IPC European Swimming Championship in Reykjavík, Iceland, Gascón, Ana Rubio, Esther Morales Fernández and Julia Castelló won a bronze medal in the 4x100 meter medley relay.

In 2010, Gascón trained at the Centre d'alt Rendiment or CAR (High Performance Center) in Sant Cugat, Barcelona Province. That year, she competed at the Tenerife International Open. As a 17-year-old, she competed at the 2010 Adapted Swimming World Championship in the Netherlands, where she won a pair of silver medals and three bronze medals. As an 18-year-old, she competed at the 2011 IPC European Swimming Championships in Berlin, Germany where she earned a gold medal in the 100 meter freestyle event. She also won a silver medal in the 200 meter freestyle race.

In 2012, Gascón competed at the Paralympic Swimming Championship of Spain by Autonomous Communities, and representing Barcelona, finished first in the SB9 women's 100m breaststroke. She raced at the 2012 Summer Paralympics, where she earned a silver medal the 100 meter butterfly race and a bronze in the 100 meter freestyle race. She, Esther Morales Fernández, Teresa Perales, Isabel Yingüa Hernández finished fourth in the 4x100 meter freestyle relay event. She competed at the 2013 Swimming Championship of Catalonia, hosted by the Sabadell Swimming Club, where she was one of nine Spanish swimmers to set a qualifying time for the World Championships. From the Catalan region of Spain, she was a recipient of a 2012 Plan ADO scholarship. She competed at the 2013 IPC Swimming World Championships.

References

External links 
 
 

1992 births
Living people
Spanish female breaststroke swimmers
Spanish female butterfly swimmers
Spanish female freestyle swimmers
Spanish female medley swimmers
Sportspeople from Terrassa
S9-classified Paralympic swimmers
Paralympic swimmers of Spain
Paralympic silver medalists for Spain
Paralympic medalists in swimming
Swimmers at the 2008 Summer Paralympics
Swimmers at the 2012 Summer Paralympics
Swimmers at the 2016 Summer Paralympics
Swimmers at the 2020 Summer Paralympics
Medalists at the 2008 Summer Paralympics
Medalists at the 2012 Summer Paralympics
Medalists at the 2016 Summer Paralympics
Medalists at the 2020 Summer Paralympics
Medalists at the World Para Swimming Championships
Medalists at the World Para Swimming European Championships
Mediterranean Games silver medalists for Spain
Mediterranean Games bronze medalists for Spain
Mediterranean Games medalists in swimming
Swimmers at the 2013 Mediterranean Games
Swimmers at the 2018 Mediterranean Games
Plan ADOP alumni
Swimmers from Catalonia
21st-century Spanish women